The Wakayama Trians are a basketball team based in Wakayama, Wakayama, formerly playing in the National Basketball League (Japan).

Notable players
Cyril Awere 
Paul Butorac (basketball)
Ace Custis
Takuya Kawamura
Zane Knowles
Yoshifumi Nakajima
Michael Parker
Rick Rickert
Shingo Utsumi

Panasonic Trians players
Makoto Akaho
Makoto Hasegawa
Juaquin Hawkins
Jerald Honeycutt
Dana Jones
Tilo Klette
Christian Maråker
Charles O'Bannon
Gerald Paddio
Mark Sanford (basketball)
Hirotaka Sato
Nobunaga Sato
Greg Stolt
Jameel Watkins
Daiji Yamada
Akifumi Yamazaki

Coaches
Yoshinori Shimizu
Paul Westhead
Željko Pavličević
Takatoshi Ishibashi (asst)

References

 
Basketball teams in Japan
Basketball teams established in 1951
1951 establishments in Japan